In this article, the results of Al Nassr Club of Saudi Arabia in 2012-2013 season is summarized.

Players 
All ages are calculated from 1 August 2012. Saudi competitions and AFC competitions allow each club to register four foreign players as long as one of them belongs to a nation under the AFC.

Transfers

Summer Transfers

In

Out

Winter Transfers

In

Out

Pre-season Preparations 
Training for the new season started on the 18 June 2012. The team left Saudi Arabia for training sessions in Barcelona, Spain on 23 June 2012 and returned to Saudi Arabia on 22 July 2012.

AlWehda International Championship 2012

Matches

First team competitions

First Team Goal Sccorer

2012–13 Saudi Professional League

Results Summary

Matches

2012–13 Saudi Crown Prince Cup

Matches

2013 King Cup of Champions

Matches 
Not announced yet.

2012–13 UAFA Cup 

The draw was made in June 2012, with Saudi Arabian teams Al Nassr and Al Fateh competing in the competition.  Al Nassr was exempted from the first round (round of 32).

Matches

Round of 16

Quarter-finals

Olympic Team Competitions

Olympic Team Goal Sccorer

2012–13 Saudi Federation Cup U-21

Results Summary

Matches

Youth Team Competitions

2012–13 Youth League U-20

Youth Team Goal Sccorer

Results Summary

Matches

2011–12 Saudi Federation Cup U-20 

There were three groups in the competition. Teams that achieved first place in their group automatically qualified into the knockout stage, along with the best second placed team.

Group stage 

Al Taawon U20 won the group stage and went to the knockout stage, with Al Alahli U20 named the best second place after acquiring 14 points in the group stage.

Youngster Team Competitions

Youngster Team Goal Sccorer

2012–13 Youngster League U-17

Results Summary

Matches

2012–13 Saudi Federation Cup U-17 

There were 3 groups in the competition. Teams that achieved first place in their group qualified automatically to the knockout stage along with the best second place team.

Group stage 

Al Taawon won the group stage and went to the knockout stage. Al Ittihad was named best second place team after acquiring 13 points in the group stage.

References

Al Nassr FC seasons
Al-Nasr